Renato Lombardo (born 11 March 1965) is an Italian wrestler. He competed in the men's freestyle 90 kg at the 1992 Summer Olympics.

References

1965 births
Living people
Italian male sport wrestlers
Olympic wrestlers of Italy
Wrestlers at the 1992 Summer Olympics
Sportspeople from Catania